Wheel Rim is an unincorporated community in Morgan County, Kentucky, United States. The community was named for a wagon wheel rim noted to be hanging in the trees.

References

Unincorporated communities in Morgan County, Kentucky
Unincorporated communities in Kentucky